At the end of the Spectra is a 2006 Colombian horror film written, produced and directed by Juan Felipe Orozco.

Plot
After a traumatic situation that turns Vega into an agoraphobe, she decides to live like a hermit in an apartment at her father's suggestion. Her life changes radically as she begins to see the inexplicable and hear the unignorable. As her horrific visions intensify, Vega begins to piece together a dark jigsaw puzzle illuminating evil's malign power. A series of explosive situations: a sinister presence in the apartment, her neighbor's bizarre obsession, and a dark forgotten past, bring the story to a chilling, claustrophobic and tense spiral.

Cast
Noëlle Schonwald as Vega
Julieth Restrepo as Tulipán
Silvia de Dios as Tulipán's Mother
Manuel José Chavez as Jairo
Carlos Serrato as Neighbour
Kepa Amuchastegui as Vega's father

Production

The apartment where Vega lived was originally an abandoned gym. The darkness of the place is similar to that of old apartments in downtown Bogotá.

Release
The film was released on December 15, 2006 and had a successful opening week. At the End of the Spectra was in the first position of the Colombian Box office.

Remakes
During 2007 news broke out that Roy Lee was planning to do an English remake with Nicole Kidman as the lead, targeting a 2010 release date. No information about this remake has appear ever since.

In 2013 a Mexican remake was released, called Demon Inside, directed by Alfonso Pineda Ulloa and starring Paz Vega in the lead.

References

External links

2006 films
2006 horror films
Colombian horror films
2000s Spanish-language films